Jan Brooijmans (3 November 1929 – 13 September 1996) was a Dutch footballer. He played in two matches for the Netherlands national football team from 1955 to 1956.

References

External links
 

1929 births
1996 deaths
Dutch footballers
Netherlands international footballers
People from Gilze en Rijen
Association football defenders
Willem II (football club) players
20th-century Dutch people